William Andrew Loomis (June 15, 1892 – May 25, 1959) was an American illustrator, writer, and art instructor. His commercial work was featured prominently in advertising and magazines; however, Loomis is best known as the writer of a series of instructional art books printed throughout the 20th century. Long after his death, Loomis's realistic style has continued to influence popular artists.

Early life
Loomis was born on June 15, 1892, in Syracuse, New York. Loomis grew up in Zanesville, Ohio, and spent much of his working life in Chicago, Illinois. He studied at the Art Students League of New York under George Bridgman and Frank DuMond when he was 19. Loomis then went back to Chicago to work at an art studio and study at the Art Institute of Chicago.

Career

After military service in World War I, Loomis worked for a couple of advertising agencies before opening his own studio in downtown Chicago in 1922. From that time until the late 1930s Loomis produced advertising paintings for many large companies such as Coca-Cola, Studebaker, Palmolive, Quaker Oats, Munsingwear and Kellogg's. He was the official portrait painter of the Dionne quintuplets, and he created Jack and Bingo for the cover of the Cracker Jack box. In 1932, Loomis created paintings for the advertisements that would introduce 3 Musketeers. One of those paintings was a portrait of a Mars chemist, Frances Herdlinger. Herdlinger was one of three women chemists working regularly with Forrest Mars Sr. on the development of the new candy bar.

In the 1930s, he taught at the American Academy of Art. It was during this time that his teaching techniques were compiled for his first book, Fun With a Pencil (1939).

Loomis would go on to release several more books in the coming decades, including one of his most popular, Figure Drawing for All It's Worth (1943). Many of the books exhibit his own personally crafted techniques – such as the "ball and plane" method of head drawing – guided by Loomis's humorous dialogue. Many of the titles gained strong appeal for their academic value and went through several printings during the 20th century. Loomis died in 1959, but his final book, The Eye of the Painter and the Elements of Beauty (1961), was printed posthumously.

Influence and legacy
Titan Books reissued the Andrew Loomis titles in facsimile editions between 2011 and 2013. Prior to that, the books had been out of print for decades, available only as excerpts by Walter Foster Publishing. Some of Loomis's books are currently being published in Japanese via Maar Sha Co., Ltd. Early prints have become highly collectible, sought by art enthusiasts and practitioners.

Bibliography
 Fun With a Pencil (1939). Reissued as a full facsimile of the original on April 5, 2013 from Titan Books.
 Figure Drawing for All It's Worth (1943). Reissued as a full facsimile of the original on May 27, 2011 from Titan Books.
 Creative Illustration (1947). Reissued as a full facsimile of the original on October 12, 2012 from Titan Books.
 Successful Drawing (1951). Republished in a revised edition as Three Dimensional Drawing (16 new pages with technical material on perspective replacing the pictorial gallery sections) and reissued as a full facsimile of the original on May 4, 2012 from Titan Books.
 Drawing the Head and Hands (1956). Reissued as a full facsimile of the original on October 21, 2011 from Titan Books.
 The Eye of the Painter and the Elements of Beauty (1961).
 I'd Love to Draw! (2014). Published posthumously by Titan Books, with some of the text written by Alex Ross.

References

External links
 Biography
 

1892 births
1959 deaths
20th-century American male artists
20th-century American painters
American art educators
American illustrators
American instructional writers
American male painters
American military personnel of World War I
Art Students League of New York alumni
Artists from Illinois
School of the Art Institute of Chicago alumni